Kaveri Express is a daily train running between Mysuru and Chennai. This train is also known as the Mysuru–Chennai Express. Numbered 16021/22, this train belongs to Southern Railway and is maintained at Chennai.

History
This train was earlier a daily train running between Bengaluru and Mysuru in the opposite direction to that of Chamundi Express. To provide connectivity to Chennai from Mysuru, this train was extended in 1998.

Coach composition
This train has 14 Sleeper classes, two 3 tier AC, two 2 tier AC, 3 unreserved Bogies and 2 second Sitting cum luggage van from Mysuru which sums to 23. Previously, there was an engine change at Bengaluru City, the engine changes from diesel to electric for 16022 and the opposite for 16021. After the electrification of the Bangalore–Mysore line, the train runs with an electric loco from Chennai to Mysore all the way.

Routing

It runs, from MGR Chennai Central via Arakkonam, Katpadi, Jolarpettai, Bangarapet, Krishnarajapuram, KSR Bengaluru, Ramanagaram, Maddur, Mandya to Mysuru Jn.

Loco link

It is hauled by a Royapuram or Lallaguda electric loco shed-based WAP-7 locomotive on its entire journey.

References

External links
16021 Kaveri Express at India Rail Info
16022 Kaveri Express at India Rail Info

Transport in Chennai
Transport in Mysore
Railway services introduced in 1980
Named passenger trains of India
Rail transport in Tamil Nadu
Rail transport in Karnataka
Express trains in India